Way of the World or The Way of the World may refer to:

Music
 "Way of the World" (Cheap Trick song), 1979
 "Way of the World" (Max Q song), 1989
 "Way of the World", a song by Flipper from the album Album – Generic Flipper
 "Way of the World" (Tina Turner song), 1991
 "Way of the World", a song by Genesis from We Can't Dance, 1991
 The Way of the World (album), a 2010 album by Mose Allison
 "The Way of the World", a 1973 song by Roger Daltrey from Daltrey

Film
 Way of the World (film), a 1910 American short drama film directed by D. W. Griffith
 The Way of the World (1916 film), an American film directed by Lloyd B. Carleton
 The Way of the World (1920 film), a British silent drama film

Other
 The Way of the World, a 1700 play by William Congreve
 "The Way of the World" (short story), an 1898 story by Willa Cather
 "The Way of the World", a translation of Verden lønner ikke anderledes, one of the Norwegian Folktales.
 Way of the World (TV program), a 1954–1955 U.S. network weekday TV program
 The Way of the World, a 2007 translation of the travel memoir by Nicolas Bouvier, originally published in French in 1963, under the title L'Usage du monde (1929–1998)
 "Way of the World", a column in the British Daily Telegraph originated by Colin Welch in 1955 but most famously associated with Michael Wharton from 1957; later written by Christopher Booker, Auberon Waugh and Craig Brown
 The Way of the World (book), a 2008 book by Ron Suskind

See also
 That's the Way of the World (disambiguation)